Jesús 'Chus' Herrera Alonso (5 February 1938 – 20 October 1962) was a Spanish footballer who played as a forward.

Club career
Born in Cabueñes, Gijón, Herrera made his professional debuts with Real Oviedo in Segunda División, playing two seasons in that level with the club. In 1958, he joined Real Madrid.

During his spell with the latter, Herrera was used mostly as a backup to the likes of Alfredo Di Stéfano, Francisco Gento, Raymond Kopa, Ferenc Puskás and Héctor Rial. In the 1959–60 edition of the European Cup, he scored three goals in five games – two against Jeunesse Esch (7–0 home win) and one against OGC Nice (2–3 away loss) – helping the team renew their supremacy in the competition.

On 4 September 1960, Herrera netted the fourth goal in a 5–1 defeat of C.A. Peñarol in the Intercontinental Cup (also the aggregate score). Shortly after, however, he was deemed surplus to requirements at Real Madrid and, in January 1962, was loaned to fellow La Liga side Real Sociedad until the end of the campaign, which ended in relegation for the Basques.

International career
Herrera played one game with Spain, appearing in a friendly with Italy on 13 March 1960, in Barcelona (3–1 win).

Death
Shortly after arriving at Real Sociedad, Herrera retired from football. On 20 October 1962, aged only 24, he died from cancer in Oviedo.

Personal life
Herrera's father, Eduardo, was also a footballer and a forward. He was a leading figure for Oviedo in the 1930s/1940s.

Honours
Real Madrid
La Liga: 1960–61
European Cup: 1958–59, 1959–60
Intercontinental Cup: 1960

References

External links

1938 births
1962 deaths
Footballers from Gijón
Spanish footballers
Association football forwards
La Liga players
Segunda División players
Real Oviedo Vetusta players
Real Oviedo players
Real Madrid CF players
Real Sociedad footballers
Spain under-21 international footballers
Spain B international footballers
Spain international footballers
Deaths from cancer in Spain